Edwards Islet is a small island with an area of 0.58 ha in Bass Strait, south-eastern Australia.  It is part of Tasmania’s Hunter Island Group which lies between north-west Tasmania and King Island.

Fauna
Breeding seabirds and shorebirds include little penguin, short-tailed shearwater, common diving-petrel, Pacific gull, silver gull, sooty oystercatcher and Caspian tern.

References

Islands of Tasmania